Linda Dangcil (June 19, 1941 – May 7, 2009) was an American actress and dancer best known for her roles as Sister Ana in the ABC television series The Flying Nun and Carmen 'Raya' Alonso in the animated series Jem.

Dangcil was a native of San Francisco, California. She graduated from Immaculate Heart High School in Los Angeles. She returned to the high school throughout her career to choreograph and assist the school's theater productions.

Career
She appeared on Broadway when she was a teenager in the 1950s in Peter Pan opposite Mary Martin, as well as in the show's television production. As a result of her work in Peter Pan, the show's co-director, Jerome Robbins, selected Dangcil as one of the main dancers in the 1961 film adaptation of West Side Story.

She was cast as Sister Ana in The Flying Nun, which ran on ABC from 1967 until 1970. The series was set at the Convent San Tanco located near San Juan, Puerto Rico. Dangcil appeared as Sister Ana in 37 episodes of the show.

Dangcil's television guest appearances included roles on The Judge, The Bold Ones, Maverick, The Rifleman, Stagecoach West and Rawhide. She also appeared in Here Come the Brides opposite actor Bruce Lee. Dangcil also starred as Elena in the 1970s PBS children's series Villa Alegre, which was created for a bilingual (English and Spanish-speaking) audience. Dangcil also worked as a voiceover actress on several animated productions. Her most recognized role was voicing the character of Carmen 'Raya' Alonso in the 1980s animated series Jem.

Dangcil also appeared in many productions of the first national tour of A Chorus Line at the Shubert Theater in Los Angeles. Her last theater role was in the East West Players production of Follies, in which she played Sally.

Dangcil also directed several productions for the Los Angeles Play Festivals. She sat on several Screen Actors Guild (SAG) committees.

Death
Linda Dangcil died at Cedars-Sinai Medical Center in Los Angeles on May 7, 2009, following an eight-year battle with throat cancer at the age of 67.  She was survived by her husband, jazz musician Dick Hamilton, and their children, Linda Michele and Sky Hamilton, as well as a granddaughter and two brothers, Mel Dangcil and Rudy Dangcil.

Filmography

References

External links
 

1941 births
2009 deaths
American female dancers
American musical theatre actresses
American stage actresses
American television actresses
American voice actresses
Deaths from cancer in California
Deaths from esophageal cancer
Actresses from Los Angeles
Actresses from San Francisco
Alumni of Immaculate Heart High School, Los Angeles
20th-century American singers
20th-century American women singers
20th-century American dancers
20th-century American actresses
21st-century American women